The Good the Bad the Waysted is British band Waysted's third studio album, released in 1985. This album gained relative recognition with its song "Hang 'em High". It was re-issued on CD in 1995 with the songs of the EP Waysted as bonus tracks.

Track listing
All songs by Muir, Chapman and Way, except "Around and Around" by Chuck Berry
Side one
 "Hang 'em High" - 5:23 
 "Hi Ho My Baby" - 3:33
 "Heaven Tonight" - 4:33
 "Manuel" - 5:18

Side two
"Dead on Your Legs" - 4:42
 "Rolling Out the Dice" - 3:39
 "Land That's Lost the Love" - 4:40
 "Crazy 'Bout the Stuff" - 5:27
 "Around and Around" - 3:13

Personnel
Band members
 Fin Muir - vocals
 Paul Chapman - guitar
 Pete Way - bass guitar

Additional musicians
 Jimmy DiLella - guitar, keyboards
 Jerry Shirley - drums

Production
Liam Sternberg - producer
Ted Sharp - engineer

References

1985 albums
Waysted albums
Music for Nations albums
Albums recorded at Rockfield Studios